Amarante Municipality may refer to:
 Amarante Municipality, Portugal
 Amarante Municipality, Piauí, Brazil

Municipality name disambiguation pages